Gujarat Maritime Board (GMB) is a government agency of the Government of Gujarat, a state of India. It was founded in 1982 to control, manage and operate the minor ports of Gujarat.

History
The GMB was founded in 1982 under the Gujarat Maritime Board Act, 1981. It controls, manage and operates total 44 minor ports of Gujarat including some with private companies.

From 3% of the total national port traffic handled by minor ports of Gujarat in 1982-83, they grown to handle 31% of total national port traffic in 2016-17. They also handles 71.3% of all minor port traffic of India. In 2018-19, minor ports of Gujarat handled total 542 MMT of cargo.

Ports
GMB operates 44 minor ports of Gujarat and they are operated under 10 port offices listed below:

 Bedi Group: Bedi, Sikka, Salaya, Jodia, Sachana
 Jafrabad Port
 Navlakhi Port
 Veraval Port
 Bhavnagar Port
 Magdalla Port
 Okha Port
 Dahej Port
 Mandvi Port
 Porbandar Port

 Greenfield ports operated by private companies
 Mundra Port
 Dahej Port
 Hazira Port
 Pipavav Port

Other ports
 Jakhau
 Victor Port

See also
 Gujarat Maritime University - operated by GMB Education Trust
 GMB Polytechnic, Rajula - operated by GMB Education Trust
 DG Sea Connect - ferry service

References

External links
 Official website

Government agencies established in 1982
State agencies of Gujarat
Economy of Gujarat
Maritime organizations
Ports and harbours of Gujarat
1982 establishments in Gujarat